1996 was designated as:
 International Year for the Eradication of Poverty

Events

January
 January 8 – A Zairean cargo plane crashes into a crowded market in the center of the capital city of the Democratic Republic of the Congo, Kinshasa, killing 300 people.
 January 9–20 – Serious fighting breaks out between Russian soldiers and rebel fighters in Chechnya.
 January 11 – Ryutaro Hashimoto, leader of the Liberal Democratic Party, becomes Prime Minister of Japan.
 January 13 – Italy's Prime Minister, Lamberto Dini, resigns after the failure of all-party talks to confirm him. New talks are initiated by President Oscar Luigi Scalfaro to form a new government.
 January 14 – Jorge Sampaio is elected President of Portugal.
 January 16 – President of Sierra Leone Valentine Strasser is deposed by the chief of defence, Julius Maada Bio. Bio promises to restore power following elections scheduled for February.
 January 19
 The North Cape oil spill occurs as an engine fire forces the tugboat Scandia ashore on Moonstone Beach in South Kingstown, Rhode Island. The North Cape Barge is pulled along with it and leaks 820,000 gallons of home heating oil.
 An Indonesian ferry sinks off the northern tip of Sumatra, drowning more than 100 people.
 January 20 – Yasser Arafat is re-elected president of the Palestinian Authority.
 January 21 – France undertakes its last nuclear weapons test.
 January 22 – Andreas Papandreou, Prime Minister of Greece, resigns due to health problems; a new government forms under Costas Simitis.
 January 24 – Polish Premier Józef Oleksy resigns amid accusations that he spied for Moscow. He is replaced by Włodzimierz Cimoszewicz.
 January 27 – Colonel Ibrahim Baré Maïnassara deposes the first democratically elected President of Niger, Mahamane Ousmane, in a military coup.
 January 31
 Colombo Central Bank bombing: an explosives-filled truck rams into the gates of the Central Bank in Colombo, Sri Lanka, killing at least 86 people and injuring 1,400.
 An amateur astronomer from southern Japan discovers Comet Hyakutake; it will pass very close to the Earth in March.

February
 February 3 – The 6.6  earthquake near Lijiang in South-west China kills up to 322 people, injures 17,000, and leaves 300,000 homeless.
 February 6 – Birgenair Flight 301, on a charter flight from the Caribbean to Germany, crashes into the Atlantic Ocean off the coast of the Dominican Republic, killing all 189 passengers and crew.
 February 7 – René Préval succeeds Jean-Bertrand Aristide as President of Haiti in the first peaceful handover of power since the nation achieved independence 192 years earlier, in 1804.
 February 9 
 The element copernicium is created by fusing a 208Pb nucleus with a 70Zn nucleus, forming 278Cn. Given the placeholder name "ununbium", the element is not named until 2010.
 An IRA ceasefire ends with the Docklands bombing in London's Canary Wharf District, killing two people and causing over £85,000,000 worth of damage.
 Disney formally finalizes its $19 billion acquisition of the ABC parent, Capital Cities/ABC Inc.
 February 10 – Bosnian Serbs break off contact with the Bosnian government and with representatives of Ifor, the NATO localised force, in reaction to the arrest of several Bosnian Serb war criminals. 
 February 14 – Violent clashes erupt between Filipino soldiers and Vietnamese boat people, as the Filipino government attempts to forcibly repatriate hundreds of Vietnamese asylum seekers.
 February 15
 The American Embassy in Athens, Greece, comes under mortar fire.
 Begum Khaleda Zia is re-elected as Prime Minister of Bangladesh. The country's second democratic election is marred by low voter turnout, due to several boycotts and pre-election violence, which has resulted in at least thirteen deaths.
 The UK government publishes the Scott Report.

 February 17 – The 8.2  Biak earthquake strikes the Papua province of eastern Indonesia with a maximum Mercalli intensity of VIII (Severe). A large tsunami followed, leaving 166 people dead or missing and 423 injured.
 February 24 – Cuban fighter jets shoot down two American aircraft belonging to the Cuban exile group Brothers to the Rescue. Cuban officials assert that they invaded Cuban airspace.
 February 25 – Two suicide bombs in Israel kill 25 and injure 80; Hamas claims responsibility.
 February 29
 Faucett Perú Flight 251 en route from Lima to Rodriguez Ballon airport crashes into a mountain near Arequipa; all 123 people on board are killed.
 At least 81 people drown when a boat capsizes 120 kilometres east of Kampala, Uganda.
 The Bosnian government declares the end of the Siege of Sarajevo.

March
 March 1 – Iraq disarmament crisis: Iraqi forces refuse UNSCOM inspection teams access to five sites designated for inspection. The teams enter the sites only after delays of up to seventeen hours.
 March 2 – 1996 Australian federal election: The Liberal/National Coalition led by John Howard defeats the Labor Government led by Prime Minister Paul Keating. Howard was sworn in on March 11.
 March 3 – José María Aznar, leader of the Popular Party, is elected as Prime Minister of Spain, replacing Felipe González.
 March 3–4 – Two suicide bombs explode in Israel, killing 32 people. The Yahya Ayyash Units admit responsibility, and Palestinian president Yasser Arafat condemns the killings in a televised address. Israel warns of retaliation.
 March 6
 Mesut Yılmaz of ANAP forms the new government of Turkey (53rd government).
 A boat carrying market traders capsizes outside Freetown harbour in Sierra Leone, killing at least 86 people.
 Chechen rebels attack the Russian government headquarters in Grozny; 70 Russian soldiers and policemen and 130 Chechen fighters are killed.
 March 8 – China begins surface-to-surface missile testing and military exercises off Taiwanese coastal areas. The United States government condemns the act as provocation, and the Taiwanese government warns of retaliation.
 March 9 – Jorge Sampaio becomes the new Portuguese president.
 March 13 – Dunblane massacre: Unemployed former shopkeeper Thomas Hamilton walks into the Dunblane Primary School in Scotland and opens fire, killing sixteen infant school pupils and one teacher before committing suicide.
 March 14 – An international peace summit is held in Egypt in response to escalating terrorist attacks in the Middle East.
 March 15 – Fokker, a major manufacturer of small size aircraft, goes bankrupt in Netherlands.
 March 16 – Robert Mugabe is re-elected as President of Zimbabwe, although only 32% of the electorate actually voted.
 March 17 – Sri Lanka wins the Cricket World Cup by beating Australia in the final.
 March 18 – The Ozone Disco Club fire in Quezon City, Philippines kills 163 people.
 March 22 – Sweden's Finance Minister Göran Persson becomes the new Prime Minister of Sweden.
 March 23 – Taiwan (Republic of China) holds its first direct elections for president; Lee Teng-hui is re-elected.
 March 24 – The Marcopper mining disaster on the island of Marinduque, Philippines takes place.
 March 25 – The 68th Academy Awards, hosted by Whoopi Goldberg, are held at the Dorothy Chandler Pavilion in Los Angeles with Braveheart winning Best Picture.
 March 26 – The International Monetary Fund approves a $10.2 billion loan to Russia for economic reform.

April
 April 3
 A Boeing 737 military jet crashes into a mountain north of Dubrovnik, Croatia. All 35 people on board are killed, including United States Secretary of Commerce Ron Brown.
 Massacres of Hutus by Tutsis in Burundi take place with more than 450 killed within a few days.
 April 6
 Fighting breaks out in Monrovia, Liberia, between various rebel factions struggling for power in the country's interrupted civil war. Several foreign nationals leave the nation.
 Turkish authorities begin Operation Hawk, a military offensive against rebels from the Kurdistan Workers' Party in south-east Turkey.
 April 9 – In a common statement, the European Union officially recognises the Federal Republic of Yugoslavia.
 April 11 – The Israeli government launches Operation Grapes of Wrath, consisting of massive attacks on Lebanon, in retaliation for "terrorist attacks", and sparking off a violent series of retaliations.
 April 18 – Qana massacre: Over 100 Lebanese civilians are killed after Israel shells the United Nations compound in Qana. In reaction, an Islamist group in Egypt opens fire on a hotel, killing eighteen Greek tourists and injuring seventeen others.
 April 21 – A general election in Italy proclaims a new center-left government headed by Romano Prodi, replacing Silvio Berlusconi.
 April 24 – At the urging of Yasser Arafat, the Palestine Liberation Organization drops its clause calling for the removal of Israel. The Israeli government responds by dropping a similar clause concerning the existence of Palestine.
 April 26 – Shanghai Five group, predecessor of the Shanghai Cooperation Organisation, is created with the signing of the Treaty on Deepening Military Trust in Border Regions in Shanghai by the heads of states of China, Kazakhstan, Kyrgyzstan, Russia and Tajikistan.
 April 28
 Port Arthur massacre (Australia): Martin Bryant kills 35 people at the Port Arthur tourist site in Tasmania.
 Bhai Pheru bus bombing: A bomb explodes in Bhai Pheru, Punjab, Pakistan, killing more than 60 people.

May
 May – Iraq disarmament crisis: UNSCOM supervises the destruction of Al-Hakam, Iraq's main production facility of biological warfare agents.
 May 9
 South Africa's National Party pulls out of the coalition government formed two years earlier, and the African National Congress assumes full political control.
 Ugandan president Yoweri Museveni wins a landslide victory in the country's first direct presidential elections, securing 75% of the vote.
 May 10
 1996 Everest disaster: A sudden storm engulfs Mount Everest with several climbing teams high on the mountain, leaving eight people dead. By the end of the month, at least four other climbers die in the worst season of fatalities on the mountain to date.
 The Australian government introduces a nationwide ban on the private possession of both automatic and semi-automatic rifles, in response to the Port Arthur massacre.
 May 11 – After takeoff from Miami, a fire started by improperly handled oxygen canisters in the cargo hold of Atlanta-bound ValuJet Flight 592 causes the Douglas DC-9 to crash in the Florida Everglades, killing all 110 people on board.
 May 13 – Severe thunderstorms and a tornado in Bangladesh kill 600 people.
 May 17–28 – Atal Bihari Vajpayee, leader of the Bharatiya Janata Party, is elected as Prime Minister of India, replacing P. V. Narasimha Rao of the Indian National Congress. However, the party does not receive an overall majority and Vajpayee resigns thirteen days later rather than face a no confidence vote and is replaced by the United Front leader, Deve Gowda.
 May 18 – The X Prize Foundation launches the $10,000,000 Ansari X Prize.
 May 21
 The MV Bukoba sinks in Tanzanian waters in Lake Victoria, killing nearly 1,000 people in one of Africa's worst maritime disasters.
 The Trappist Martyrs of Atlas are executed.
 May 23 – Members of the Armed Islamic Group in Algeria kill seven French Trappist monks, after talks with French government concerning the imprisonment of several GIA sympathisers break down.
 May 27 – First Chechnya War: Russian President Boris Yeltsin meets with Chechnyan rebels for the first time and negotiates a ceasefire for the dispute.
 May 28 – Albania's general election of May 26 is declared unfair by international monitors, and the ruling Democratic Party under President Muhannad Ibrahim is charged by the Organization for Security and Co-operation in Europe with rigging the elections. Several hundred protestors gather in Tirana to demonstrate against the election result.
 May 30 – The Likud Party, led by Benjamin Netanyahu, wins a narrow victory in the Israeli general election.

June
 June – Iraq disarmament crisis: As Iraq continues to refuse inspectors access to a number of sites, the United States fails in its attempt to build support for military action against Iraq in the UN Security Council.
 June 1–3 – The Czech Republic's first general election ends inconclusively. Prime Minister Václav Klaus and his incumbent Civic Democratic Party emerge as the winners, but are unable to form a majority government. President Václav Havel refuses to invite Klaus to form a coalition.
 June 4 – The space rocket Ariane 5 explodes forty seconds after takeoff in French Guiana. The project costs European governments $7,500,000,000 over eleven years.
 June 6 – Leighton W. Smith, Jr. resigns as NATO commander in the face of increasing criticism.
 June 8–30 – England hosts the UEFA Euro 1996 football tournament, which is won by Germany.
 June 11
 An explosion in a São Paulo suburban shopping centre kills 44 people and injures more than 100.
 A peace convoy carrying Chechen separatist leaders and international diplomats is targeted by a series of remotely controlled land mines; eight people are killed.
 June 15 – In Manchester, UK, an IRA bomb injures over 200 people and devastates a large part of the city centre.
 June 28
 A new government is formed in Turkey, with Necmettin Erbakan of Refah Partisi becoming Prime Minister of the coalition government, and Deputy/Foreign Minister Tansu Çiller of the True Path Party succeeding him after two years.
 The Constitution of Ukraine is signed into law.
 June 29
 The Prince's Trust concert is held in Hyde Park, London, and is attended by 150,000 people. The Who headlines the event in their first performance since 1989.
 An explosion in a firecrackers factory in Sichuan Province, China kills at least 52 people and injures 83 others.
 June 30
 Costas Simitis is elected president of the Panhellenic Socialist Movement of Greece.
 Bosnian Serb leader Radovan Karadžić relinquishes power to his deputy, Biljana Plavšić.

July
 July
 Iraq disarmament crisis: U.N. Inspector Scott Ritter attempts to conduct surprise inspections on the Republican Guard facility at the airport but is blocked by Iraqi officials.
 The Indian government officially renames the city of Madras, restoring the name Chennai.
 July 1
 The Northern Territory in Australia legalises voluntary euthanasia.
 German orthography reform of 1996 agreed internationally.
 July 3 – Boris Yeltsin is re-elected as President of Russia after the second round of elections.
 July 5 – Dolly the sheep, the first mammal to be successfully cloned from an adult cell, is born at the Roslin Institute in Midlothian, Scotland, UK.
 July 11 – Arrest warrants are issued for Bosnian Serb war criminals Radovan Karadžić and Ratko Mladić by the Russell Tribunal in The Hague.
 July 12 – Hurricane Bertha: made landfall in North Carolina as a Category 2 storm, causing $270 million in damage ($ in present-day terms) to the United States and its possessions and many indirect deaths.
 July 16 – An outbreak of E. coli food poisoning in Japan results in 6,000 children being ill, including two deaths, after a group of school children eat contaminated lunches.
 July 17
 The Community of Portuguese Language Countries (Comunidade dos Países de Língua Portuguesa) is constituted.
 Paris- and Rome-bound TWA Flight 800 (Boeing 747) explodes off the coast of Long Island, New York, killing all 230 people on board.
 July 19
 The 1996 Summer Olympics in Atlanta, United States, begin.
 Bosnian Serb President Radovan Karadžić resigns from public office in Republika Srpska after being indicted for war crimes.
 July 21 – The Saguenay Flood, one of Canada's most costly natural disasters, is caused by flooding on the Saguenay River in Quebec.
 July 24 – The Dehiwala train bombing kills 56 commuters outside Colombo.
 July 25 – The Tutsi-led Burundian army performs a coup and reinstalls previous president Pierre Buyoya, ousting current president Sylvestre Ntibantunganya.
 July 27 – The Centennial Olympic Park bombing at the 1996 Summer Olympics in the United States kills one person and injures 111.

August

 August
 The first three-parent baby is conceived in New Jersey through mitochondrial donation.
 The invasive species Asian long-horned beetle is found in New York City.
 August 1
 Sarah Balabagan returns to the Philippines.
 A pro-democracy demonstration supporting Megawati Sukarnoputri in Indonesia is broken up by riot police.
 August 4 – The 1996 Summer Olympics conclude.
 August 6 – NASA announces that the Allan Hills 84001 meteorite, thought to originate from Mars, may contain evidence of primitive lifeforms; further tests are inconclusive.
 August 7 – Heavy rains kill more than 80 campers near Huesca, Spain.
 August 9 – Boris Yeltsin is sworn in at the Kremlin for a second term as President of Russia.
 August 13 – Data sent back by the Galileo space probe indicates there may be water on one of Jupiter's moons.
 August 14 – A rocket ignited during a fireworks display in Arequipa, Peru knocks down a high-tension power cable into a dense crowd, electrocuting 35 people.
 August 15 – Bob Dole is nominated for President of the United States, and Jack Kemp for vice president, at the Republican National Convention in San Diego, California.
 August 16 – Brookfield Zoo, Chicago.
 August 21
 Former State President of South Africa, F. W. de Klerk, makes an official apology for crimes committed under Apartheid to the Truth and Reconciliation Commission in Cape Town.
 In the UK, Queen Elizabeth II issues letters patent on divorced former wives of British princes, taking away from the ex-wives the attribute and style of Royal Highness. With that Sarah, Duchess of York as well as Diana, Princess of Wales legally cease to be Royals, but they remain as non-royal Duchess and Princess.
 August 23 – Osama bin Laden writes "The Declaration of Jihad on the Americans Occupying the Country of the Two Sacred Places," a call for the removal of American military forces from Saudi Arabia.
 August 26 – Civil Rights Movement historian Randy Kryn and 10 others are arrested by the Federal Protective Service while protesting in a demonstration at the Kluczynski Federal Building in downtown Chicago during that year's Democratic National Convention.
 August 28 – Their Royal Highnesses, the Prince and Princess of Wales, are formally divorced at the High Court of Justice in London. Her Royal Highness The Princess of Wales is restyled Diana, Princess of Wales, due to the Queen's letters patent issued a week earlier.
 August 29
 U.S. President Bill Clinton and Vice President Al Gore are re-nominated at the Democratic National Convention in Chicago.
 A Russian Tupolev 154 jetliner crashes into a mountain as it approaches the airport at Spitsbergen, Norway, killing all 141 people on board.
 August 31 – Iraq disarmament crisis: Iraqi forces launch an offensive into the northern No-Fly Zone and capture Arbil.

September
 September 2 – A permanent peace agreement is signed at the Malacañan Palace between the Government of the Philippines and the Moro National Liberation Front.
 September 3 – The United States launches Operation Desert Strike against Iraq in reaction to the attack on Arbil.
 September 4 – The Revolutionary Armed Forces of Colombia attack a military base in Guaviare, Colombia, starting three weeks of guerrilla warfare that will claim the lives of at least 130 Colombians.
 September 5 – Hurricane Fran makes landfall near Cape Fear, North Carolina as a Category 3 storm with  sustained winds. Fran caused over $3 billion in damages ($ in present-day terms) and killed 27 people, mainly in North Carolina. The name "Fran" was retired due to the extensive damage.
 September 10 – Comprehensive Nuclear Test Ban Treaty (CTBT) signed (it will be ratified 180 days after ratification by 44 Annex 2 countries).
 September 13 – Alija Izetbegović is elected President of Bosnia and Herzegovina in the country's first election since the Bosnian War.
 September 20 – Leader of Pakistani opposition party Pakistan Peoples Party Murtaza Bhutto is killed during a gunfight with police.
 September 22 – The Panhellenic Socialist Movement under the leadership of Costas Simitis succeeds in the 1996 Greek legislative election.
 September 24 – U.S. President Bill Clinton signs the Comprehensive Nuclear-Test-Ban Treaty at the United Nations.
 September 27 – In Afghanistan, the Taliban capture the capital city of Kabul, after driving out President Burhanuddin Rabbani and executing former leader Mohammad Najibullah.
 September 29 – The Nintendo 64 is released in North America.

October
 October 2 – Aeroperú Flight 603 crashes into the Pacific Ocean when the instruments fail just after takeoff from Lima Airport, killing all 70 people on board.
 October 6 – The government of New Zealand agrees to pay $130 million worth of compensation for the loss of land suffered by the Māori population between the years of 1844 and 1864.
 October 22 – A fire at La Planta prison in southwest Caracas, Venezuela, kills thirty prisoners.
 October 31 – TAM Transportes Aéreos Regionais Flight 402 crashes into a densely populated area of São Paulo, killing all 96 people on board.

November
 November – Iraq disarmament crisis: UNSCOM inspectors uncover buried prohibited missile parts. Iraq refuses to allow UNSCOM teams to remove remnants of missile engines for analysis outside of the country.
 November 5 – 1996 United States presidential election: Incumbent Democratic President Bill Clinton defeats his Republican challenger, Bob Dole and Reform Party candidate Ross Perot.
 November 7
 A category 4 cyclone strikes Andhra Pradesh, India, killing at least 1,000 people.
 NASA launches the Mars Global Surveyor.
 November 8 – All 144 people on board a Nigerian-owned Boeing 727 die after the aircraft crashed into the Atlantic Ocean while approaching Lagos airport.
 November 12 – Saudi Arabian Airlines Boeing 747 collides in mid-air with Kazakhstan Airlines Il-76 in New Delhi, India, resulting in the loss of 349 lives.
 November 17
 A bomb explodes in Kaspiysk, Russia, killing 32 people.
 Emil Constantinescu is elected as President of Romania.
 November 18 – Frederick Chiluba is re-elected as President of Zambia.
 November 19
 Martin Bryant is sentenced to 35 consecutive sentences of life imprisonment plus 1,035 years without parole for murdering 35 people in a shooting spree in Tasmania earlier this year.
 Preparatory Commission for the Comprehensive Nuclear Test Ban Organization (CTBTO) established.
 STS-80: Space Shuttle Columbia conducts the longest mission of the Space Shuttle program.
 November 20 – The 1996 Garley Building fire occurred in Hong Kong, resulting in 41 deaths and 81 injuries.
 November 21 – A propane explosion at the Humberto Vidal shoe store and office building in San Juan, Puerto Rico kills 33 people.
 November 23
 The Republic of Angola officially joins the World Trade Organization as Angola.
 Ethiopian Airlines Flight 961 is hijacked, then crashes into the Indian Ocean off the coast of Comoros after running out of fuel, killing 125.
 November 25 – An ice storm strikes the U.S. killing 26 directly and hundreds more from accidents. A powerful windstorm blasts Florida with winds gusts up to 90 mph.

December
 December 9 – Jerry Rawlings is re-elected as President of Ghana.
 December 11 – Tung Chee-hwa is appointed to become the new leader of Hong Kong after it reverts to Chinese rule on July 1, 1997, at the end a 99-year lease to the United Kingdom.
 December 13 – Ghanaian diplomat Kofi Annan is elected by the United Nations Security Council the next Secretary-General of the United Nations.
 December 17 – The Túpac Amaru Revolutionary Movement takes 72 hostages in the Japanese Embassy in Lima, Peru.
 December 25 – At least 283 migrants drown in the sinking of F174 near Capo Passero (Sicily).
 December 26 
 The largest strike in South Korean history begins.
 Six-year-old JonBenét Ramsey is found beaten and strangled in the basement of her family's home in Boulder, Colorado.
 December 27 – Taliban forces retake the strategic Bagram Air Base, solidifying their buffer zone around Kabul.
 December 29 – Guatemala and the leaders of the Guatemalan National Revolutionary Unity sign a peace accord that ends the 36-year Guatemalan Civil War.
 December 30 – In the Indian state of Assam, a passenger train is bombed by Bodo separatists, killing 26.

Births

January

 January 3 – Florence Pugh, English actress
 January 6 
 Soufiane El Bakkali, Moroccan steeplechase runner
 Courtney Eaton, Australian actress
 Harmanpreet Singh, Indian hockey player
 January 7 – Helly Shah, Indian actress 
 January 10 
 Tara Fares, Iraqi model (d.2018)
 Tang Kai, Chinese mixed martial artist and current ONE Featherweight World Champion
 Joshua Pacio, Filipino mixed martial artist and former ONE Strawweight World Champion
Anna Sztankovics, Hungarian swimmer
 January 11 
 Tyler Reddick, American racing driver
 Leroy Sané, German footballer
 January 12 – Ella Henderson, English singer
 January 13 – Taiki Naito, Japanese Muay Thai kickboxer
 January 15 – Dove Cameron, American actress and singer
 January 16
 Anastasia Grishina, Russian artistic gymnast
 Jennie, South Korean singer and rapper
 January 17 – Nile Wilson, British artistic gymnast 
 January 21 – Marco Asensio, Spanish footballer
 January 24 – Patrik Schick, Czech footballer
 January 31 – Joel Courtney, American actor

February

 February 1 – Ahmad Abughaush, Jordanian taekwondo athlete
 February 2 – Harry Winks, English footballer
 February 7
 Aaron Ekblad, Canadian ice hockey player
 Mai Hagiwara, Japanese singer
 February 9 
 Jimmy Bennett, American actor
 Kelli Berglund, American actress
 Chungha, South Korean singer and dancer
 February 11 – Lucas Torreira, Uruguayan footballer
 February 13 – Muhammad Rian Ardianto, Indonesian badminton player
 February 14 
 Lucas Hernandez, French footballer
 Viktor Kovalenko, Ukrainian footballer
 February 15 – Toshikazu Yamanishi, Japanese race walker
 February 17 – Sasha Pieterse, South African-born American actress
 February 20 – Mabel, English singer
 February 21 – Noah Rubin, American tennis player
 February 23 – D'Angelo Russell, American basketball player
 February 25 – Emel Dereli, Turkish shot putter
 February 28 – Shi Yuqi, Chinese badminton player

March

 March 1 – Ye Shiwen, Chinese swimmer 
 March 5 – Emmanuel Mudiay, Congolese professional basketball player
 Michael Evans Behling, American actor
 March 6
 Christian Coleman, American sprinter
 Timo Werner, German footballer
 Yan Han, Chinese figure skater
 March 8 – Destiny Wagner, Belizean author, television host, digital influencer, model, and beauty pageant titleholder who was crowned Miss Earth 2021
 March 9 – Giorgio Minisini, Italian synchronized swimmer
 March 23 – Alexander Albon, Thai racing driver
 March 24
 Valentino Lazaro, Austrian footballer
 Myles Turner, American basketball player
 March 26 – Kathryn Bernardo, Filipina actress
 March 27 – Rosabell Laurenti Sellers, Italian-American actress
 March 28
 Benjamin Pavard, French footballer
 Xie Siyi, Chinese diver
 March 31 – Kira Hagi, Romanian actress

April

 April 2
 Polina Agafonova, Russian figure skater
 Matheus Santana, Brazilian swimmer
 April 3 – Sarah Jeffery, Canadian actress
 April 4 – Austin Mahone, American singer-songwriter and actor
 April 9 – Giovani Lo Celso, Argentinian footballer
 April 10
 Andreas Christensen, Danish footballer
 Thanasi Kokkinakis, Australian tennis player
 Loïc Nottet, Belgian singer
 April 11 
 Dele Alli, English footballer
 Summer Walker, American singer
 April 12 – Matteo Berrettini, Italian tennis player
 April 14 – Abigail Breslin, American actress
 April 15 – Edimilson Fernandes, Swiss footballer
 April 16 – Anya Taylor-Joy, actress
 April 17 – Dee Dee Davis, American actress
 April 22 – Wendy Sulca, Peruvian singer
 April 23 – Álex Márquez, Spanish motorcycle racer
 April 24 – Ashleigh Barty, Australian tennis player
 April 25
 Mack Horton, Australian swimmer 
 Allisyn Ashley Arm, American actress
 April 27
 Tejan Koroma, American Football Player 
 April 28 – Tony Revolori, American actor
 April 29 – Katherine Langford, Australian actress

May

 May 2 – Julian Brandt, German footballer
 May 3 – Alex Iwobi, Nigerian footballer
 May 4
 Arielle Gold, American snowboarder
 Pelayo Roza, Spanish sprint canoeist.
 May 8 – 6ix9ine, American rapper
 May 9
 Noah Centineo, American actor
 Mary Mouser, American actress
 May 10 – Tyus Jones, American basketball player
 May 11 – Andrés Cubas, Argentinian footballer
 May 14
 Martin Garrix, Dutch DJ and producer 
 Imane Anys, Canadian Twitch streamer
 May 15 
 Birdy, English singer and songwriter
 Ilias Ennahachi, Dutch-Moroccan Muay Thai kickboxer and former ONE Flyweight Kickboxing World Champion
 May 19 
 Chung Hyeon, South Korean tennis player
 Lakshmi Menon, Indian film actress
 May 18 – Yuki Kadono, Japanese snowboarder
 May 23 – Katharina Althaus, German ski jumper
 May 30
 Aleksandr Golovin, Russian footballer
 Lucki, American rapper
 May 30 – Erik Jones, American racing car driver
 May 31 – Normani, American singer

June

 June 1 – Tom Holland, English actor
 June 3 – Han Tianyu, Chinese short track speed skater
 June 4 – Manuel Andújar, Argentine four-wheeled motorcycle racer
 June 10 – Wen Junhui, Chinese singer and actor
 June 12 – Davinson Sánchez, Colombian footballer
 June 13
 Kingsley Coman, French footballer
 Kodi Smit-McPhee, Australian actor
 June 15 – Aurora, Norwegian singer
 June 16 
 Ayaka Miyoshi, Japanese actress and model
 Lily Zhang, American table tennis player
 June 17 – Godfred Donsah, Ghanese footballer
 June 18 – Alen Halilović, Croatian footballer
 June 19 – Larisa Iordache, Romanian artistic gymnast
 June 22
 Hugo Calderano, Brazilian table tennis player
 Kong Sang-jeong, South Korean short track speed skater
 June 24 – Harris Dickinson, English actor, writer, and director
 June 27 – Lauren Jauregui, American singer
 June 28
 Milot Rashica, Kosovar footballer 
 Donna Vekić, Croatian tennis player

July

 July 1 
 Ludovic Fabregas, French handball player
 Adelina Sotnikova, Russian figure skater
 July 3 – Kendji Girac, French singer
 July 4 – Ryoya Kurihara, Japanese baseball player 
 July 5 – Risa Shōji, Japanese figure skater
 July 7 – Mikey Musumeci, American BJJ practitioner and current ONE Flyweight Submission Grappling World Champion
 July 8 – Angela Lee, Singaporean-American mixed martial artist and current ONE Women's Atomweight World Champion
 July 10 – Moon Ga-young, South Korean actress
 July 11
 Alessia Cara, Canadian singer-songwriter
 Andrija Živković, Serbian footballer
 July 12 – Magnus Saugstrup, Danish handball player
 July 18 – Yung Lean, Swedish rapper and record producer
 July 20 – Ben Simmons, Australian basketball player

August

 August 1
 Arisa Higashino, Japanese badminton player
 Cymphonique Miller, American actress and singer
 August 2 – Simone Manuel, American swimmer
 August 5
 Francesca Deagostini, Italian artistic gymnast
 Mai Murakami, Japanese artistic gymnast
 August 10 – Evan Evagora, Australian actor
 August 12 – Arthur, Brazilian footballer
 August 14 – Brianna Hildebrand, American actress
 August 16 – Caeleb Dressel, American swimmer
 August 18 – Jonathan Di Bella, Italian-Canadian kickboxer and current ONE Strawweight Kickboxing World Champion
 August 19
 Almoez Ali, Sudanese-Qatari footballer
 Laura Tesoro, Belgian singer and actress
 August 21 – Jasmine Camacho-Quinn, Puerto Rican hurdler
 August 24 – Kenzō Shirai, Japanese gymnast
 August 27
 Femke Van den Driessche, Belgian cyclist found guilty of mechanical doping
 Ebru Topçu, Turkish footballer
 August 28 – Kim Se-jeong, South Korean singer and actress
 August 30
 Gabriel Barbosa, Brazilian footballer
 Chen Dequan, Chinese short track speed skater

September
 

 September 1 – Zendaya, American actress and singer
 September 3 – Joy, South Korean singer and actress
 September 5 – Sigrid, Norwegian singer
 September 9 – Jaïro Riedewald, Dutch footballer
 September 12 
Joshua Cheptegei Ugandan long distance runner
Colin Ford, American actor
 September 17
 Duje Ćaleta-Car, Croatian footballer
 Ella Purnell, English actress
 September 19 –  Steve Wijler, Dutch archer
 September 23
 Lee Hi, South Korean singer-songwriter
 Evgeny Rylov, Russian swimmer
 September 25 – Mie Nielsen, Danish swimmer
 September 27 – Maxwel Cornet, French-Ivorian footballer
 September 28 – Michael Ronda, Mexican actor and singer

October

 October 3 – Kelechi Iheanacho, Nigerian footballer
 October 7 – Lewis Capaldi, Scottish singer-songwriter
 October 8 – Sara Takanashi, Japanese ski jumper
 October 9
 Jacob Batalon, American-Filipino actor
 Bella Hadid, American model
 October 10 – Oscar Zia, Swedish singer and songwriter
 October 12 – Vitória Strada, Brazilian actress
 October 13
 Joshua Wong, Hong Kong student activist and politician
 Đỗ Mỹ Linh, Vietnamese model
 October 15 – Zelo, Korean singer
 October 17 – Cansu Özbay, Turkish volleyball player
 October 20 – Anthony Sinisuka Ginting, Indonesian badminton player
 October 24
 Jaylen Brown, American basketball player
 Kyla Ross, American gymnast
 October 28 – Lee June-hyoung, South Korean figure skater
 October 30 – Devin Booker, American basketball player

November

 November 1
 Sean Gelael, Indonesian racing driver
 Lil Peep, American rapper (d. 2017)
Daniela Melchior, Portuguese actress
 Jeongyeon, South Korean singer
 November 4 – Michael Christian Martinez, Filipino figure skater
 November 7
 André Horta, Portuguese footballer
 Lorde, New Zealand singer-songwriter
 November 9
 Nguyễn Thị Ánh Viên, Vietnamese swimmer
 Kevin Gulliksen, Norwegian handball player
 Momo Hirai, Japanese singer and dancer
 November 11
 Adam Ounas, French-born Algerian footballer
 Tye Sheridan, American actor
 November 14 – Borna Ćorić, Croatian tennis player
 November 16 
 Brendan Murray, Irish singer
 Jan Zieliński, Polish tennis player
 November 17 – Ruth Jebet, Bahraini long-distance runner
 November 18
 Akram Afif, Qatari footballer
 Noah Ringer, American actor
 Sorn, South Korean based singer
 November 19 
 Liliána Szilágyi, Hungarian swimmer
 Krystsina Tsimanouskaya, Belarusian sprinter
 November 20 – Denis Zakaria, Swiss footballer
 November 21 – Gina Lückenkemper, German sprinter
 November 22 
 Hailey Baldwin, American model and socialite
 JuJu Smith-Schuster, American football player 
 November 23 
 James Maddison, English footballer
 Anna Yanovskaya, Russian ice dancer
 November 26 – Louane Emera, French singer and actress
 November 27 – Felix Kashweka, Zambian journalist and publicist
 November 29 – Gonçalo Guedes, Portuguese footballer

December

 December 4 – Daria Svatkovskaya, Russian artistic gymnast
 December 6 – Stefanie Scott, American actress and singer
 December 7 – Gabrielle Thomas, American sprinter
 December 10
 Joe Burrow, American football player
 Kang Daniel, South Korean singer
 Ayano Sato, Japanese speed skater
 Jonas Vingegaard, Danish cyclist
 December 11
 Eliza McCartney, New Zealand track and field athlete
 Hailee Steinfeld, American actress, model and singer
 December 14 – Li Zijun, Chinese figure skater
 December 15 – Oleksandr Zinchenko, Ukrainian footballer
 December 16 – Wilfred Ndidi, Nigerian footballer
 December 17 – Elizaveta Tuktamysheva, Russian figure skater
 December 19 – Franck Kessié, Ivorian footballer
 December 21 – Kaitlyn Dever, American actress
 December 28 – Alfred Kipketer, Kenyan middle-distance runner
 December 29
 Dylan Minnette, American actor, singer and musician
 Sana, Japanese singer
 December 30
 Stephanie Del Valle, Puerto Rican musician, model and beauty queen
 Zack Baun, American Football Player

Deaths

January

 January 1 – Arleigh Burke, American naval officer (b. 1901)
 January 5 – Yahya Ayyash, Palestinian shaheed (b. 1966)
 January 7
 Károly Grósz, 51st Prime Minister of Hungary (b. 1930)
 Tarō Okamoto, Japanese artist (b. 1911)
 January 8 – François Mitterrand, French politician, 21st President of France (b. 1916)
 January 15
 Les Baxter, American musician and composer (b. 1922)
 Moshoeshoe II, King of Lesotho (b. 1938)
 January 17 – Barbara Jordan, American lawyer, educator, politician and civil rights activist (b. 1936)
 January 18
 Leonor Fini, Argentine artist (b. 1908)
 Endel Puusepp, Estonian pilot (b. 1909)
 N. T. Rama Rao, Indian actor, producer, director, editor and politician (b. 1923)
 January 19 – Don Simpson, American film producer (b. 1943)
 January 20 – Gerry Mulligan, American musician (b. 1927)
 January 25 – Jonathan Larson, American composer and playwright (b. 1960)
 January 28
 Joseph Brodsky, Russian-born American Nobel poet (b. 1940)
 Jerry Siegel, American cartoonist (b. 1914)

February

 February 2 – Gene Kelly, American actor and dancer (b. 1912)
 February 3 – Audrey Meadows, American actress (b. 1922)
 February 4 – Alfredo Nobre da Costa, 106th Prime Minister of Portugal (b. 1923)
 February 6 – Guy Madison, American actor (b. 1922)
 February 7 – Boris Tchaikovsky, Russian composer (b. 1925)
 February 9 – Adolf Galland, German general (b. 1912)
 February 11 
 Kebby Musokotwane, Prime Minister of Zambia (b. 1946)
 Bob Shaw, Irish science fiction writer (b. 1931)
 February 12 – Ryōtarō Shiba, Japanese novelist (b. 1923)
 February 13 – Martin Balsam, American actor (b. 1919)
 February 14
 Eva Hart, British Titanic survivor (b. 1905)
 Bob Paisley, English football manager (b. 1919)
 February 16 – Pat Brown, American politician (b. 1905)
 February 20
 Solomon Asch, Polish-American psychologist (b. 1907)
 Audrey Munson, American model and actress (b. 1891)
 Toru Takemitsu, Japanese composer (b. 1930)
 February 21 – Morton Gould, American musician and composer (b. 1913)
 February 23
 William Bonin, American serial killer (b. 1947)
 Helmut Schön, German football player and manager (b. 1915)
 February 25 – Haing S. Ngor, Cambodian activist and actor (b. 1940)
 February 26 – Mieczysław Weinberg, Polish composer (b. 1919)
 February 27 – Sarah Palfrey Cooke, American tennis player (b. 1912)

March

 March 2 
 Jacobo Majluta Azar, 47th President of the Dominican Republic (b. 1934)
 Lyle Talbot, American actor (b. 1902)
 March 3 
 Marguerite Duras, French author and director (b. 1914)
 John Krol, American cardinal (b. 1910)
 March 4 – Minnie Pearl, American comedian (b. 1912)
 March 5
 Khondaker Mostaq Ahmad, 5th President of Bangladesh (b. 1918)
 Whit Bissell, American actor (b. 1909)
 March 9 – George Burns, American comedian and actor (b. 1896)
 March 10 – Ross Hunter, American film producer (b. 1920)
 March 11 – Vince Edwards, American actor (b. 1928)
 March 12 – Gyula Kállai, 48th Prime Minister of Hungary (b. 1910)
 March 13 
 Lucio Fulci, Italian film director, screenwriter, producer, and actor (b. 1927)
 Krzysztof Kieślowski, Polish film director (b. 1941)
 March 17 – René Clément, French film director (b. 1913)
 March 18 – Odysseas Elytis, Greek writer (b. 1911)
 March 19
 Virginia Henderson, American nurse and theorist (b. 1897)
 Chen Jingrun, Chinese mathematician (b. 1933)
 March 22 – Robert F. Overmyer, American astronaut (b. 1936)
 March 25 – Lola Beltrán, Mexican singer, actress, and television presenter (b. 1932)
 March 26
 Edmund Muskie, American politician (b. 1914)
 David Packard, American engineer (b. 1912)
 March 31 – Jeffrey Lee Pierce, American musician (b. 1958)

April

 April 3 – Ron Brown, American politician (b. 1941)
 April 4 – Barney Ewell, American athlete (b. 1918)
 April 6 – Greer Garson, British-American actress (b. 1904)
 April 8 – Ben Johnson, American actor and stuntman (b. 1918)
 April 13 – James Burke, Irish-American gangster (b. 1931)
 April 16 – Lucille Bremer, American actress and dancer (b. 1917)
 April 18 – Bernard Edwards, American bass player (b. 1952)
 April 20 – Christopher Robin Milne, English author and bookseller (b. 1920)
 April 21 – Dzhokhar Dudayev, Chechen politician and President of Ichkeria (b. 1944)
 April 23 – P. L. Travers, British actress, journalist, novelist and writer (b. 1899)
 April 25 – Saul Bass, American graphic designer (b. 1920)
 April 26 – Stirling Silliphant, American screenwriter and producer (b. 1918)
 April 28 – Siti Hartinah, 2nd First Lady of Indonesia (b. 1923)

May

 May 1 – David M. Kennedy, American politician, businessman (b. 1905)
 May 2 – Emile Habibi, Palestinian Israeli writer and politician (b. 1922)
 May 3 – Jack Weston, American actor (b. 1924)
 May 6 – Leo Joseph Suenens, Belgian cardinal (b. 1904)
 May 11
Nnamdi Azikiwe, 1st President of Nigeria (b. 1904)
 Scott Fischer, American mountaineer (b. 1955)
 Rob Hall, New Zealand mountaineer (b. 1961)
Andrew Harris, New Zealand mountaineer (b. 1964)
Doug Hansen, American mountaineer (b. 1949)
Yasuko Namba, Japanese mountaineer (b. 1949)
Tsewang Samanla, Indo-Tibetan Border police officer and mountaineer (b. 1957)
Tsewang Paljor, Indo-Tibetan Border police officer and mountaineer (b. 1968)
Dorje Morup, Indo-Tibetan Border police officer and mountaineer (b. 1948)
Ademir de Menezes, Brazilian footballer (b. 1922)
 May 17 – Johnny "Guitar" Watson, American singer, songwriter and musician (b. 1935)
 May 19 – John Beradino, American baseball player and actor (b. 1917)
 May 20 – Jon Pertwee, British actor (b. 1919)
 May 23 – Sim Iness, American Olympic athlete (b. 1930)
 May 24
 John Abbott, English actor (b. 1905)
 Jacob Druckman, American composer (b. 1928)
 May 25 – Bradley Nowell, American musician (b. 1968)
 May 29 – Tamara Toumanova, Russian-American dancer and actress (b. 1919)
 May 31 – Timothy Leary, American writer and social activist (b. 1920)

June

 June 1 – Neelam Sanjiva Reddy, 6th President of India (b. 1913)
 June 2
 John Alton, American cinematographer (b. 1901)
 Pilar Lorengar, Spanish soprano (b. 1928)
 June 3 – Peter Glenville, English film director (b. 1913)
 June 6
 Kusuo Kitamura, Japanese Olympic swimmer (b. 1917)
 George Davis Snell, American Nobel geneticist (b. 1903)
 June 10 – Jo Van Fleet, American actress (b. 1914)
 June 11 – Brigitte Helm, German actress (b. 1908)
 June 15 – Ella Fitzgerald, American singer (b. 1917)
 June 19
 Hillevi Rombin, Swedish actress and beauty queen (b. 1933)
 Edvin Wide, Swedish middle- and long-distance runner (b. 1896)
 June 23
 Ray Lindwall, Australian cricketer (b. 1921)
 Andreas Papandreou, Prime Minister of Greece (b. 1919)
 June 26 – Veronica Guerin, Irish journalist (b. 1958)
 June 27 – Albert R. Broccoli, American film producer (b. 1909)
 June 28 – Kwan Tak-hing, Hong Kong actor (b. 1905)

July

 July 1 – Margaux Hemingway, American fashion model and actress (b. 1954)
 July 3 – Raaj Kumar, Indian film actor (b. 1926)
 July 9
 Eno Raud, Estonian writer (b. 1928)
 Sergey Kuryokhin, Russian pianist, composer, improvisor, performance artist and actor (b. 1954)
 July 13 – Pandro S. Berman, American film producer (b. 1905)
 July 15 – Dana Hill, American actress (b. 1964)
 July 17 – Paul Touvier, French Nazi collaborator (b. 1915)
 July 20 – František Plánička, Czech footballer (b. 1904)
 July 21
 Luana Anders, American actress (b. 1938)
 Herb Edelman, American actor (b. 1933)
 July 22 – Jessica Mitford, British-American author, journalist and political campaigner (b. 1917)
 July 23 – Jean Muir, American actress (b. 1911)
 July 27 – Jane Drew, English architect (b. 1911)
 July 28 – Roger Tory Peterson, American naturalist and artist (b. 1908)
 July 30 – Claudette Colbert, American actress (b. 1903)

August

 August 1
 Mohamed Farrah Aidid, Somali military commander and politician (b. 1934)
 Frida Boccara, French singer (b. 1940)
 Tadeusz Reichstein, Polish-Swiss Nobel chemist (b. 1897)
 August 2
 Michel Debré, 99th Prime Minister of France (b. 1912)
 Obdulio Varela, Uruguayan footballer (b. 1917)
 August 6 – Hernán Siles Zuazo, 46th President of Bolivia (b. 1914)
 August 8 – Nevill Francis Mott, English Nobel physicist (b. 1905)
 August 11
 Rafael Kubelík, Czech-born Swiss conductor (b. 1914)
 Baba Vanga, Bulgarian mystic, clairvoyant and herbalist (b. 1911)
 August 12 – Viktor Hambardzumyan, Armenian scientist (b. 1908)
 August 13
 António de Spínola, 14th President of Portugal (b. 1910)
 David Tudor, American pianist and composer (b. 1926)
 August 26 – Alejandro Agustín Lanusse, 37th President of Argentina (b. 1918)
 August 27 – Greg Morris, American actor (b. 1933)
 August 30 – Christine Pascal, French actress, director and screenwriter (b. 1953)

September

 September 1 – Vagn Holmboe, Danish composer (b. 1909)
 September 7 – Bibi Besch, American actress (b. 1942)
 September 9
 Ruggero Mastroianni, Italian film editor (b. 1929)
 Bill Monroe, American musician (b. 1911)
 September 10 – Joanne Dru, American actress (b. 1922)
 September 12 – Ernesto Geisel, Brazilian general, 29th President of Brazil (b. 1907)
 September 13 – Tupac Shakur, American rapper (b. 1971)
 September 14 – Juliet Prowse, American dancer and actress (b. 1936)
 September 16 
 McGeorge Bundy, American academic (b. 1919)
 Gene Nelson, American dancer and actor (b. 1920)
 September 17 – Spiro Agnew, 39th Vice President of the United States (b. 1918)
 September 18 – Annabella, French actress (b. 1907)
 September 20
 Murtaza Bhutto, Pakistani politician (b. 1954)
 Paul Erdős, Hungarian mathematician (b. 1913)
 Max Manus, Norwegian resistance fighter (b. 1914)
 September 22 
 Mohamed Ben Ahmed Abdelghani, 1st Prime Minister of Algeria (b. 1927)
 Dorothy Lamour, American actress (b. 1914)
 September 24 – Zeki Müren, Turkish singer, composer, songwriter, actor and poet (b. 1931)
 September 26
 Nicu Ceaușescu, Romanian politician (b. 1951)
 Pavel Sudoplatov, Soviet spy (b. 1907)
 Geoffrey Wilkinson, English Nobel chemist (b. 1921)
 September 27 – Mohammad Najibullah, President of Afghanistan (b. 1947)
 September 29 – Shūsaku Endō, Japanese author (b. 1923)

October

 October 4 – Silvio Piola, Italian footballer (b. 1913)
 October 5 – Seymour Cray, American computer scientist (b. 1925)
 October 11
 Renato Russo, Brazilian singer (b. 1960)
 William Vickrey, Canadian-American economist and academic, Nobel Prize laureate (b. 1914)
 October 12
 René Lacoste, French tennis player (b. 1904)
 Roger Lapébie, French racing cyclist (b. 1911)
 October 13 – Beryl Reid, British actress (b. 1919)
 October 19 – Shamsuddin Qasemi, Bangladeshi Islamic scholar and politician (b. 1935)
 October 24 – Artur Axmann, German Nazi leader (b. 1913)
 October 31 – Marcel Carné, French film director (b. 1909)

November

 November 1 – J. R. Jayewardene, 2nd President of Sri Lanka (b. 1906)
 November 2 – Eva Cassidy, American vocalist (b. 1963)
 November 3
 Jean-Bédel Bokassa, 2nd President of the Central African Republic and Emperor of Central Africa (b. 1921)
 Abdullah Çatlı, Turkish nationalist (b. 1956)
 November 6 – Tommy Lawton, English footballer and manager (b. 1919)
 November 14
 Joseph Bernardin, American cardinal (b. 1928)
 Virginia Cherrill, American actress (b. 1908)
 November 15 – Alger Hiss, American diplomat (b. 1904)
 November 18 – Zinovy Gerdt, Russian actor (b. 1916)
 November 21 – Abdus Salam, Pakistani Nobel physicist (b. 1926)
 November 22 – María Casares, French-Spanish actress (b. 1922)
 November 26 – Paul Rand, American graphic designer (b. 1914)
 November 27 – Gertrude Blanch, American mathematician (b. 1897)
 November 28 – Don McNeill, American tennis player (b. 1918)
 November 30 – Tiny Tim, American musician (b. 1932)

December

 December 3 – Babrak Karmal, President of Afghanistan (b. 1929)
 December 7 – José Donoso, Chilean writer (b. 1924)
 December 9 – Mary Leakey, British archaeologist (b. 1913)
 December 10 – Faron Young, American singer (b. 1932)
 December 11 – Willie Rushton, English comedian, actor and cartoonist (b. 1937)
 December 13 – Cao Yu, Chinese playwright (b. 1910)
 December 16 – Quentin Bell, English biographer and art historian (b. 1910)
 Laurens van der Post, South African author (b. 1906)
 December 17 – Stanko Todorov, Bulgarian communist politician (b. 1920)
 December 18 – Irving Caesar, American lyricist (b. 1895)
 December 19 – Marcello Mastroianni, Italian actor (b. 1924)
 December 20
 Amata Kabua, 1st President of the Marshall Islands (b. 1928)
 Carl Sagan, American astronomer (b. 1934)
 December 30 
 Lew Ayres, American actor (b. 1908)
 Jack Nance, American actor (b. 1943)

Nobel Prizes

 Physics – David M. Lee, Douglas D. Osheroff, Robert C. Richardson
 Chemistry – Robert Curl, Sir Harold Kroto, Richard Smalley
 Medicine – Peter C. Doherty, Rolf M. Zinkernagel
 Literature – Wisława Szymborska
 Peace – Carlos Filipe Ximenes Belo and José Ramos-Horta
 Bank of Sweden Prize in Economic Sciences in Memory of Alfred Nobel – James Mirrlees, William Vickrey

Right Livelihood Award
 Herman Daly, The Committee of Soldiers' Mothers of Russia, Kerala Sasthra Sahithya Parishad and George Vithoulkas

References

 1996 Year in Review – CNN

 
Leap years in the Gregorian calendar